USS Acadia (AD-42) was a  in the service of the United States Navy, named after Acadia National Park.  She was inactive and in reserve after her 1994 decommissioning at Naval Inactive Ship Maintenance Facility (NISMF), Pearl Harbor, Hawaii, under maintenance category B, until sunk off Guam during a live-fire training exercise (Valiant Shield) on 20 September 2010. She was the first ship to house a wartime mixed-sex crew and was unofficially nicknamed "The Love Boat" in the 1991 Persian Gulf War after 36 women (10% of women in the crew) became pregnant during deployment.

She was ordered on 11 March 1976, laid down on 14 February 1978 at San Diego by National Steel and Shipbuilding Company, launched on 28 July 1979, sponsored by Mrs. Clarence R. Bryan, wife of Vice Admiral Bryan, and commissioned on 6 June 1981.

Service history

1981–1987 
Acadia completed her outfitting at her builder's yard on 6 July and then made the brief trip to Naval Station San Diego. After a month clearing details and getting ready, the destroyer tender embarked upon her shakedown cruise on 7 August. That voyage took her to Pearl Harbor, Hawaii, and back to San Diego where she arrived on 28 August. When the ship returned to her home port, her crew concentrated their efforts on honing their skills as repairmen; and, except for a few brief periods at sea for underway training and propulsion plant certification, Acadia spent the rest of the year in port at San Diego.

The destroyer tender began 1982 as a fully operational mobile repair facility of the Pacific Fleet. She provided her services at San Diego until the beginning of February when she moved to the Naval Air Station, Alameda. At the end of the month, she steamed back to San Diego. Late in May, the ship embarked Naval Academy and NROTC midshipmen for their summer training cruise. On 14 June, Acadia stood out of San Diego on her way to Hawaii. The destroyer tender repaired ships of the Pacific Fleet at Pearl Harbor from 22 June to 25 July. Returning to San Diego in August, she spent the remainder of the year in the immediate vicinity of her home port. Though she put to sea occasionally for training purposes, the majority of the time, she was in San Diego doing repair work for the fleet.

In December 1982, Acadia began preparations for the first overseas assignment of her career. On 4 January 1983, the destroyer tender put to sea for a journey that took her not only to the Orient but into the Indian Ocean and to the east coast of Africa as well. Acadia stopped at Pearl Harbor between 12 and 14 January and, after another ten days at sea, arrived in Yokosuka, Japan, on 24 January. Acadia remained at Yokosuka for almost a month then visited Sasebo before setting a course for the Philippines on 23 February. The ship entered Subic Bay, Luzon on 27 February and performed repairs until 3 March when she put to sea for duty in the Indian Ocean. She reached the British outpost on Diego Garcia Island on 13 March and worked at that location for 16 days. On 29 March, Acadia headed for the east coast of Africa. She visited Mombasa, Kenya from 4 to 11 April, called at Mogadishu, the capital of Somalia, between 13 and 16 April, and paused overnight at Masirah, an island off the coast of Oman near the Horn of Africa, on 22 and 23 April. The destroyer tender returned to the base at Diego Garcia on 29 April and spent the next month there repairing warships on duty in the troubled waters of the Arabian Sea and the Persian Gulf.

On 2 June 1983, Acadia departed Diego Garcia on her way to Pattaya, Thailand. The ship arrived at Pattaya on 11 June. For the rest of the deployment, she operated in Far Eastern waters proper. From Pattaya, she steamed back to Subic Bay where she provided repair services to ships of the US 7th Fleet during the latter part of June. During July, Acadia called at Hong Kong, Pusan in Korea, and at Sasebo, Japan. On 16 July, the destroyer tender stood out of Sasebo on her way back to the United States. She took the usual break in the transpacific voyage at Pearl Harbor between 27 and 29 July and reentered San Diego harbor on 4 August.

Acadia remained at San Diego for about two months after her return from the Orient. Post-deployment stand down consumed the first month, but she got back to work providing repair service during the second. Near the middle of October, the destroyer tender voyaged north to Bremerton, Washington, where she carried on her duties until 4 November. Returning south by way of San Francisco, Acadia reached San Diego again on 12 November. She resumed repair work at San Diego upon her return and remained so occupied through the end of 1983 and well into 1984. In fact, the ship did not get underway again until late in March 1984 when she put to sea for three days in the southern California operating area. She returned to port on 23 March and resumed repair work until June. During the week of 11 to 18 June, Acadia made the round-trip to Monterey and back. In July, she participated in a midshipman summer training cruise and, in August, carried out refresher training in the local operating area. During the remaining months of 1984, the destroyer tender concentrated on repair work and preparations for her second deployment overseas.

Acadia embarked upon the voyage to the Far East on 5 January 1985. She stopped over in Pearl Harbor from 12 to 14 January and then resumed her journey west. Steaming by way of Guam, the destroyer tender arrived in Subic Bay on 2 February. She conducted repairs there for about a week and voyaged to Hong Kong for a port visit. The ship returned to Subic Bay during the latter part of February and stayed there until 8 March. At that time, she headed for Japan. During March, she called at Sasebo and at the Korean ports of Pusan and Chinhae. On 28 March, the tender returned to Japan at Yokosuka. Acadia spent the remainder of her tour of duty with the 7th Fleet at Yokosuka carrying out an extremely heavy schedule of repairs on warships assigned to that fleet. On 12 June, she set out upon the voyage home. Acadia stopped at Pearl Harbor as usual and pulled into San Diego on 3 July. After a month of leave and upkeep, the destroyer tender began preparations for her first regular overhaul. On 16 September, she moved to the former Southwest Marine Shipyard (now owned by BAE Systems, and renamed BAE Systems San Diego Ship Repair) in San Diego where she underwent repairs until mid-December.

Holiday leave and upkeep occupied the last half of December 1985, but Acadia launched into a full schedule of repair services in January 1986. Except for occasional brief periods at sea and a port visit to San Francisco in June, she remained at San Diego until September. Early in the month, she put to sea for refresher training and, on the 28th, embarked upon the passage to Alameda. Acadia arrived at the Naval Air Station, Alameda, on 1 October and began a busy six weeks of repair work there. The destroyer tender returned to San Diego in the middle of November and spent the remainder of 1986 in preparations for overseas movement.

Although originally slated to deploy in January 1987, Acadia provided repair services to ships in the San Diego area into the spring. On 14 April, the tender sailed for the western Pacific, and after touching at Pearl Harbor (21 – 22 April) and Subic Bay (8 – 18 May), was en route to Diego Garcia when she was rerouted to the Persian Gulf.

An Iraqi Mirage F.1 had attacked and severely damaged the guided missile frigate  on 17 May 1987. The crippled ship had limped into Bahrain, where Acadia was dispatched soon thereafter. Between 1 and 27 June, Acadia provided berthing, messing, and repair services to Stark, "doing what she (Acadia) was designed to do, providing forward deployed support and battle damage repair..."

1987–1994 

On 5 September 1990 the ship departed San Diego for the Persian Gulf during Operation Desert Shield and Operation Desert Storm. She was responsible for the first reload of shipboard Tomahawk missiles outside the continental U.S. while pierside in Mina Jebel Ali. The reload recipient was the guided missile destroyer .

This was the first wartime deployment of a mixed male-female crew on a U.S. Navy combat vessel. Just over one-third of her crew were women, which caused some controversy when during the course of the mission 1 in 10 of the female crew either became pregnant or discovered they already were.

On 30 October 1990,  sustained a catastrophic mechanical failure when a high-pressure steam valve burst. This cost the lives of ten of the crew but repairs kept her fully operational for Desert Storm after six weeks of repairs by Acadia.

On 18 February 1991, the cruiser  struck two influence mines in the Persian Gulf just forward of her after  gun mount during Operation Desert Storm, resulting in a cracked superstructure, a jammed port rudder and leaking port shaft seal. Despite severe damage to her stern, her forward weapon systems and Aegis combat system were back online within fifteen minutes. Princeton remained on station for 30 hours until relieved. Repairs in the Mina Jebel Ali near Dubai took five weeks, performed by the destroyer tender on duty: Acadia, after which Princeton returned to the United States under her own power for additional repairs. The ship returned to San Diego from the deployment. Acadia received the Navy Unit Commendation for her exemplary service during the Gulf War.

In the summer of 1993, sea trials were conducted earning the Acadia two Battle E's for battleship preparedness prior to her pending WestPac. In early November 1993, she deployed for one last WestPac to the Persian Gulf. Her crew of around 1500 was now half female. They cruised to Hawaii then to Guam for supplies before setting course for Hong Kong. They were intended to go to Singapore then the Gulf. However, because of continued tensions in Mogadishu, Somalia, the ship received orders to divert on their way to the UAE. The ship encountered Typhoon Kyle in the South China Sea before she made a brief anchoring in Singapore for mail and personnel exchange. The crew then set out for Bali conducting their last Wog Day en route. The ship made a week-long layover in Balie for R&R as the crew wouldn't see shore for over a month.

The Acadia arrived off the coast of Mogadishu the first week of December 1993. Upon arrival, one of their crew members from the Boats and Cranes division of the Deck Department was knocked overboard while lowering the ship's stairwell. The waters were known to be shark-infested as fisheries and meat processors frequently dumped their byproducts in the ocean. Fortunately, SN Muhammad was rescued quickly with the launching of a small boat and rescue swimmers stationed aboard.

Acadia delivered overdue medical, dental, supply, and repair services to the Marines and Navy Sailors that were present in Mogadishu by conducting boat runs operated by the Boats and Cranes division. Many of these service members had been without running water for days or weeks and obviously worn from their mission efforts. To brighten the spirits of fellow soldiers and sailors, the ship created a choir to perform for Christmas adding comical flare by rewording the Twelve Days of Christmas to reflect their time underway and presence in Mogadishu. The ship remained present offering support until 30 December 1993 when it got underway for the Straits of Oman and the UAE where she remained in support of submarines and Navy ships for three weeks. Her final voyage home involved working ports in Hong Kong for a second time, Sasebo Japan, Yokosuka Japan, Guam, and Pearl Harbor Hawaii before returning home to San Diego, CA mid-April 1994.

The ship and crew had earned The Joint Forces Armed Expeditionary Medal upon its return, and a bronze star on her Southwest Asia Service Medal.

Decommissioning and fate

On 16 December 1994, Acadia was decommissioned and laid up at the Naval Inactive Ship Maintenance Facility (NISMF), Pearl Harbor, Hawaii.  She was struck from the Naval Register on 13 December 2007 and sunk as a target off Guam on 19–20 September 2010.  The sinking of Acadia was part of a day-long bombardment of ordnance delivered from naval aircraft and ships during exercise Valiant Shield.

Awards, citations, and campaign ribbons

Precedence of awards is from top to bottom, left to right
 Top row – Navy Unit Commendation
 Second row – Navy Battle "E" Ribbons (5), Navy Expeditionary Medal (2-Persian Gulf), National Defense Service Medal
 Bottom row – Armed Forces Expeditionary Medal (2-Persian Gulf, 1-Somalia), Southwest Asia Service Medal, Defense and Liberation of Kuwait Medal (Kuwait)

References 
 

Yellowstone-class destroyer tenders
Cold War auxiliary ships of the United States
Gulf War ships of the United States
1979 ships
Tenders of the United States Navy
Destroyer tenders of the United States
Ships sunk as targets